Provincetown Arts is an annual magazine published in midsummer that focuses on artists, performers and writers who inhabit or visit Lower Cape Cod and the cultural life of the nation's oldest continuous artists' colony in Provincetown. Drawing upon a century-long tradition of art, theater and writing, Provincetown Arts publishes essays, fiction, interviews, journals, poetry, profiles, reporting, reviews and visual features. Provincetown Arts is published by Provincetown Arts Press, Inc., a 501(c)(3) non-profit organization.

History
Provincetown Arts was launched in 1985. It was co-founded by artist Raymond Elman (1985-1990) and the late Christopher Busa, who remained the publisher and editorial director until his passing in 2020. He is the son of painter Peter Busa (1914–1985), who participated in the formative years of Abstract Expressionism and formed a school for painters in Provincetown.

Contributors to the magazine include emerging artists as well as established figures. Its articles mainly cover art, culture, and literature. Articles also feature topics of national interest, including profiles of prominent figures, human interest stories, interviews and book reviews.

Since 2006, the magazine has featured in each issue two cover artists, one visual artist and one writer. There was an exception to this format in 2014, when the magazine focused on the centennial celebration of the Provincetown Art Association and Museum.

Featured writers and artists

 Vol. 1, 1985 Stanley Kunitz
 Vol. 2, 1986 Fritz Bultman, Douglas Huebler and Jerry Robinson
 Vol. 3, 1987, Norman Mailer
 Vol. 4, 1988, Robert Motherwell
 Vol. 5,1989, Annie Dillard
 Vol. 6, 1990, Joel Meyerowitz
 Vol. 7, 1991, Long Point Gallery
 Vol. 8, 1992, Stanley Kunitz
 Vol. 9, 1993, Fine Arts Work Center
 Vol. 10, 1994, Mark Doty
 Vol. 11, 1995, Mary Oliver
 Vol. 12, 1996, Karen Finley
 Vol. 13, 1997/98, John Waters
 Vol. 14, 1999, Norman Mailer
 Vol. 15, 2000, Eileen Myles
 Vol. 16, 2001, Alan Dugan and Judith Shahn
 Vol. 17, 2002, Sebastian Junger
 Vol. 18, 2003, Hayden Herrera
 Vol. 19, 2004, Paul Resika
 Vol. 20, 2005, Michael Cunningham
 Vol. 21, 2006, Tony Vevers and Nick Flynn
 Vol. 22, 2007, Helen Miranda Wilson and Robert Jay Lifton
 Vol. 23, 2008, Michael Mazur and Gail Mazur
 Vol. 24, 2009, Varujan Boghosian and Mary Oliver
 Vol. 25, 2010, Anne Bernays and Mira Schor
 Vol. 26, 2011, Richard Baker and Roger Skillings
 Vol. 27, 2012, Selina Trieff and Robert Pinsky
 Vol. 28, 2013, Anne Packard and Jhumpa Lahiri
 Vol. 29, 2014, Provincetown Art Association and Museum
 Vol. 30, 2015, Paul Bowen and John Yau
 Vol. 31, 2016, Tabitha Vevers and Marie Howe
 Vol. 32, 2017, Sharon Horvath and Alec Wilkinson

Notable contributors 

 Keith Althaus
 Charles Bernstein
 Philip Brady
 Melanie Braverman
 Paul Brodeur
 Marshall Brooks
 Susan Rand Brown
 Peter Campion
 Cyrus Cassells
 Molly Malone Cook
 William Corbett
 Jay Critchley
 Carl Dennis
 Maggie Dietz
 Raymond Elman
 Lawrence Ferlinghetti
 David Ferry
 B. H. Friedman
 Frank Gaspar
 Allen Ginsberg
 Lucy Grealy
 John Grillo
 Chaim Gross
 Hazel Hawthorne
 Seamus Heaney
 William Heyen
 Tony Hoagland
 Hans Hofmann
 Budd Hopkins
 Marie Howe
 Peter Hutchinson
 E. J. Kahn, Sr.
 David Kaplan
 Howard Karren
 April Kingsley
 Michael Klein
 Tony Kushner
 Fred Leebron
 J. Michael Lennon
 Jennifer Liese
 Townsend Ludington
 John Buffalo Mailer
 Norris Church Mailer
 Hilary Masters
 Cleopatra Mathis
 Mary Maxwell
 Gail Mazur
 Richard McCann
 Elizabeth McCracken
 David Michaelis
 Susan Mitchell
 Stanley Moss
 Lise Motherwell
 Hunter O'Hanian
 Grace Paley
 Carl Phillips
 Taylor Polites
 Victoria Redel
 Martha Rhodes
 Mischa Richter
 Liz Rosenberg
 Anne Sanow
 Christina Schlesinger
 Lloyd Schwartz
 Salvatore Scibona
 Alan Shapiro
 Jason Shinder
 Charles Simic
 John Skoyles
 Tom Sleigh
 Michael Sperber
 Myron Stout
 Mark J. Straus
 May Swenson
 Jean Valentine
 Katherine Vaz
 Tabitha Vevers
 Tony Vevers
 Arturo Vivante
 Rosanna Warren
 Joshua Weiner
 C. K. Williams
 Rebecca Wolff

Prizes and awards
From 1986 to the present, Provincetown Arts has received over 100 Pushcart Nominations for Fiction, Nonfiction and Poetry. Its Nonfiction ranking in 2016 continues to improve from its 2015 ranking.
 1988 Best American Essays
 1989 Print Certificate of Design Excellence
 1991 Notable Essays of 1990
 1991 Best American Poetry
 1992 American Literary Magazine Awards: First Place for Editorial Content & Design
 1993 Pushcart Prize XVIII: Best of the Small Presses
 1993 Best American Poetry
 1993 American Literary Magazine Awards: First Place for Editorial Content
 1994 Notable Essays of 1993
 1994 Editor's Choice IV: Essays from the U.S. Small Press 1978–92
 1994 American Literary Magazine Awards: First Place for Editorial Content
 1995 Pushcart Prize XX: Best of the Small Presses
 1996 American Literary Magazine Awards: Special Mention for Design in 1995
 1998 Best American Movie Writing
 2002 Distinguished Short Stories of 2001
 2003 Pushcart Prize XXIX: Best of the Small Presses
 2003 Best American Poetry
 2008 Pushcart Prize XXXII: Best of the Small Presses, Special Mention
 2009 Best American Poetry

See also
List of literary magazines

References

External links
 

1985 establishments in Massachusetts
Annual magazines published in the United States
Literary magazines published in the United States
Magazines established in 1985
Magazines published in Massachusetts
Visual arts magazines published in the United States